Shahbaz is the name of a fabled bird in Persian mythology. It is described as having a body similar to an eagle, being bigger in size than a hawk or falcon, and having inhabited an area within the Zagros, the Alborz, and the Caucasus within Greater Iran. In ancient Persian mythology, the Shahbaz was a god who helped the Iranian peoples and guided the Faravahar to the Iranian lands.

History 
The word Shahbaz literally translates to "royal falcon". It was standard practice for the Persian Shah to keep a royal falcon or another bird of prey. This symbol represented both strength and aggressiveness. The ancient Egyptian deity of Horus is speculated to have been the archetype for the standard of Cyrus the Great, who founded the Achaemenid Empire.

British explorer Richard F. Burton considered the symbol to refer to the goshawk species Accipiter gentilis. Shahbaz could have alternatively referred to another common bird over the skies of the Iranian Plateau: the eastern imperial eagle, though this observation has never been claimed by historians as merited. 

During the Achaemenid era, the Persian imperial flag was hence rectangular in shape, divided kite-like into four equal triangles alternating between two colours. The standard, a ceramic plaque with the fabled bird-like creature that is speculated to be the Shahbaz carved out, was found during excavations at Persepolis in the early 20th century. The belief is that this was the official symbol of the Achaemenid Empire under Cyrus the Great and his heirs.

See also 

 Chamrosh, a Persian mythical bird that is described as having inhabited the Alborz Mountains
 Huma bird, a legendary bird in Persian and later cultural Islamic mythology
 Simurgh, a mythical bird in Iranian literature

References

Mythological birds of prey
Persian legendary creatures
Zoroastrian legendary creatures
Persian mythology
Asian mythology
Horus
Falcon deities